The 2016–17 EHF Challenge Cup was the 20th edition of the European Handball Federation's third-tier competition for men's handball clubs, which was won by Sporting CP running from 19 November 2016 to 27 May 2017.

Overview

Team allocation 
 TH: Title holders

Round and draw dates 
All draws held at the European Handball Federation headquarters in Vienna, Austria.

Round 3 
Teams listed first played the first leg at home. Some teams agreed to play both matches in the same venue. Bolded teams qualified into last 16.

|}

Last 16 
Teams listed first played the first leg at home. Some teams agreed to play both matches in the same venue. Bolded teams qualified into quarter-finals.

|}

Quarterfinals 

|}

Semifinals 

|}

Final 

|}

See also 
 2016–17 EHF Champions League
 2016–17 EHF Cup

References

External links 
 EHF Challenge Cup (official website)

Challenge Cup
Challenge Cup
EHF Challenge Cup